is a railway station in the town of Nasu, Tochigi Prefecture, Japan, operated by the East Japan Railway Company (JR East).

Lines
Toyohara Station is served by the Tōhoku Main Line, and is located 176.7 kilometers from the official starting point of the line at Tokyo Station.

Station layout
Toyohara Station has two opposed side platforms connected to the station building by a footbridge. The station is unattended.

Platforms

History
Toyohara Station opened on July 16, 1887. It was renamed  on April 1, 1925, but reverted to its original name on August 1, 1948. The station was absorbed into the JR East network upon the privatization of Japanese National Railways (JNR) on April 1, 1987.

Surrounding area
The station is located in an isolated mountainous area, with few buildings in the vicinity.

See also
 List of railway stations in Japan

External links

 JR East Station information 

Stations of East Japan Railway Company
Railway stations in Tochigi Prefecture
Tōhoku Main Line
Railway stations in Japan opened in 1887
Nasu, Tochigi